Kumakahpan is a Wayana village in the Sipaliwini District of Suriname. The village lies on the banks of the Lawa River, which forms the border with French Guiana.

Name 
Kumakahpan means "place of the Kapok tree".

Geography 

Notes

References 

Indigenous villages in Suriname
Populated places in Sipaliwini District